Milivoje Mijović (born December 18, 1991) is a Serbian professional basketball player for Belfius Mons-Hainaut of the BNXT league.

He was born in Belgrade.

References

External links
 Milivoje Mijovic at Eurobasket.com
 Milivoje Mijovic  at FIBA.com
 Milivoje Mijovic  at BGBasket.com

1991 births
Living people
Basketball players from Belgrade
BC Levski Sofia players
Belfius Mons-Hainaut players
BK Patrioti Levice players
BKK Radnički players
KK Slodes players
MKS Dąbrowa Górnicza (basketball) players
Power forwards (basketball)
Serbian expatriate basketball people in Bulgaria
Serbian expatriate basketball people in North Macedonia
Serbian expatriate basketball people in Poland
Serbian expatriate basketball people in Romania
Serbian expatriate basketball people in Slovakia
Serbian expatriate basketball people in Slovenia
Serbian men's basketball players